Cultural depictions of prime ministers of the United Kingdom have become commonplace since the term's first use in 1905. However, they have been applied to prime ministers who were in office before the first use of the term. They are listed here chronologically from the date of first appointment as prime minister.

William Pitt the Younger

Number 10 depicts him as Prime Minister.
Blackadder the Third depicts him anachronistically as a teenager, and also features a younger brother "William Pitt the Even Younger".
He is played by Benedict Cumberbatch in the 2006 biographical drama Amazing Grace (2006).

Duke of Wellington

Lord Melbourne
Melbourne has been portrayed in the following film and television productions:
H. B. Warner in Victoria the Great (1937)
Frederick Leister in The Prime Minister (1941) 
Richard Mathews in Churchill's People (1975)
Joseph O'Conor in Edward the Seventh (1975)
Nigel Hawthorne in Victoria & Albert (TV serial) (2001)
Paul Bettany in The Young Victoria (2009)
Rufus Sewell in Victoria (2016–2019)

Robert Peel
Michael Barrington in Edward the Seventh (1975)
Tom Ward in the TV series The Frankenstein Chronicles (he is depicted while he was still the Home Secretary).
Michael Maloney in The Young Victoria (2009)
Nigel Lindsay in Victoria (2016–2017)

Lord Palmerston
Palmerston has been portrayed in the following film and television productions:
Wallace Bosco in Balaclava (1928)
Felix Aylmer in:
Victoria the Great (1937)
Sixty Glorious Years (1938)
The Lady with a Lamp (1951)
Gilbert Emery in A Dispatch from Reuter's (1940)
André Morell in Edward the Seventh (1975)
James Fox in 1864 (2014)
Laurence Fox in Victoria (2016–2019)

Benjamin Disraeli

William Gladstone
Gladstone has been portrayed in the following film and television productions:
Montagu Love in Parnell (1937)
Arthur Young in:
Victoria the Great (1937)
The Lady with a Lamp (1951)
Malcolm Keen in Sixty Glorious Years (1938)
Stephen Murray in The Prime Minister (1941)
Gordon Richards in The Imperfect Lady (1947) 
Ralph Richardson in Khartoum (1966)
Graham Chapman in Monty Python's Flying Circus (1969)
Willoughby Gray in Young Winston (1972)
David Steuart in Jennie: Lady Randolph Churchill (1974)
Michael Hordern in Edward the Seventh (1975)
John Carlisle in Disraeli (1978)
John Phillips in Lillie (1978)
Roland Culver in The Life and Times of David Lloyd George (1981)
Denis Quilley in Number 10 (1983)

Lord Salisbury
Salisbury has been portrayed in the following film and television productions:
Harvey Braban in Sixty Glorious Years (1938)
Leslie Perrins in The Prime Minister (1941)
Llewellyn Rees in Jennie: Lady Randolph Churchill (1974)
Hugh Dickson in Churchill's People (1975)
Richard Vernon in Edward the Seventh (1975)
John Gregg in Disraeli (1978)
John Gielgud in Murder by Decree (1979)
John Forbes-Robertson in Number 10 (1983) 
David Swift in Jack the Ripper (1988)
David Ryall in Around the World in 80 Days (2004)
Michael Gambon in Victoria & Abdul (2017)

David Lloyd George

"Lloyd George Knew My Father" is a well-known ditty, with the lyrics "Lloyd George knew my father/Father knew Lloyd George" repeated incessantly to the tune of "Onward, Christian Soldiers". The origin and meaning of the song are disputed. One theory is that it references the peerages-for-cash scandal.
A feature film, The Life Story of David Lloyd George, was made in 1918 by Ideal Films, suppressed, rediscovered in 1994, and first shown in 1996. Norman Page played the role of Lloyd George.
In the film British Agent (1934), Lloyd George is portrayed by George C. Pearce.
In the film Royal Cavalcade (1935), Lloyd George is portrayed by Esme Percy.
In the film Wilson (1944), Lloyd George is portrayed by Clifford Brooke.
In 1946 the BBC Home Service broadcast Man of the People, a radio portrait of Lloyd George, written and directed by P. H. Burton and with Clifford Evans as Lloyd George.
Richard Attenborough's film Young Winston (1972) features Lloyd George as a character, portrayed by Anthony Hopkins.
The Edwardians (1972-1973 miniseries) also features Anthony Hopkins as Lloyd George.
In the television series Edward the Seventh (1975), Lloyd George is portrayed by Geoffrey Beevers.
A television series The Life and Times of David Lloyd George was made in 1981. Philip Madoc played Lloyd George.
In the television series Number 10 (1983), Lloyd George is portrayed by John Stride.
In the television film A Dangerous Man: Lawrence After Arabia (1990), Lloyd George is portrayed by Bernard Lloyd.
In the Irish historical television film The Treaty (1991), Lloyd George is portrayed by Ian Bannen.
In the television series The Young Indiana Jones Chronicles (1992–93), Lloyd George is portrayed by Michael Kitchen.
In the television series Mosley (1998), Lloyd George is portrayed by Windsor Davies.
In the television film The Lost Prince (2003), Lloyd George is portrayed by Ron Cook.
In the film Suffragette (2015), Lloyd George is portrayed by Adrian Schiller.
In Sue Limb’s BBC Radio 4 comedy sitcom Gloomsbury (Series 4, 2017), Lloyd George is parodied as the libidinous Llewd George, played by John Sessions.
In the film Mr. Jones (2019), Lloyd George is portrayed by Kenneth Cranham.

Bonar Law

Bonar Law is briefly mentioned several times in Ken Follett's historical novel Fall of Giants (Book One of the Century Trilogy).
Bonar Law plays a supporting, if off-screen, role in Upstairs, Downstairs.  He is even said to have recommended family patriarch, Richard Bellamy, to be offered a peerage.
His name is referenced by Julian and Sandy in Round the Horne, in a sketch called "Bona Law".
Rebecca West's novel Sunflower features a portrait of Bonar Law as the statesman Hurrell.
Arnold Bennett's novel Lord Raingo features Bonar Law as the chancellor of the exchequer Hasper Clews.
Lord Dunsany gently satirised the quiet way in which government decisions are made which affect many (but with little input from the many) in his short story The Pearly Beach. It begins "We couldn't remember, any of us at the Club, who it was that first invented the twopenny stamp on cheques. There were eight or nine of us there, and not one of us could put a name to him. Of course, a lot of us knew, but we'd all forgotten it. And that started us talking of the tricks memory plays..." The name they were groping for was that of Bonar Law.
In the 1981 TV series The Life and Times of David Lloyd George Bonar Law appears in two episodes and is played by Fulton Mackay.

Stanley Baldwin

Baldwin has been portrayed in the following film and television productions:
The Forsyte Saga (1967), played by Ralph Michael
The Woman I Love (1972), played by Robert Douglas
The Gathering Storm (1974), played by Thorley Walters
Days of Hope (1975), played by Brian Hayes
Edward & Mrs Simpson (1978), played by David Waller
The Life and Times of David Lloyd George (1981), played by Paul Curran
Winston Churchill: The Wilderness Years (1981), played by Peter Barkworth
The Woman He Loved (1988), played by David Waller
You Rang, M'Lord? (1991), played by Patrick Blackwell
The Gathering Storm (2002), played by Derek Jacobi
Wallis & Edward (2005), played by Richard Johnson
The King's Speech (2010), played by Anthony Andrews
W.E. (2011), played by Geoffrey Palmer

The character of ‘’Stanley’’ (referred to in his only book appearance as ‘’No. 2’’) from the British children’s book series ‘The Railway Series’’, a Baldwin Class 10-12-D locomotive, was named after Baldwin.

Ramsay MacDonald
The main villain of the 1907 novel Lord of the World by Robert Hugh Benson was partly based on MacDonald.
In Howard Spring's 1940 novel Fame is the Spur, later made into a 1947 film and a 1982 TV adaptation, the lead character Hamer Shawcross loosely resembles MacDonald; it is the story of a working-class Labour activist who grows into an establishment politician.
In Gandhi he is portrayed by Terrence Hardiman. In the 1981 television series Winston Churchill: The Wilderness Years, MacDonald appears as a significant character in the early episodes and is played by Robert James.
In Graham Greene's 1934 novel It's a Battlefield, MacDonald's name repeatedly appears in newspapers and on billboards in reference to a visit to Lossiemouth. He is also mentioned and featured in Noël Coward's film This Happy Breed.
In the twenty-fourth episode of Monty Python's Flying Circus, original footage of MacDonald entering No. 10 Downing Street is followed by a black-and-white film of him (played by Michael Palin) doing a striptease, revealing garter belt, suspender and stockings.
In the 1983 television series Number 10, he was portrayed by Ian Richardson.
In Thomas Pynchon's Gravity's Rainbow, Old Brigadier Ernest Pudding during his initial interwar retirement "started in on a mammoth work entitled Things That Can Happen in European Politics. Begin, of course, with England. 'First,' he wrote, 'Bereshith, as it were: Ramsay MacDonald can die.' By the time he went through resulting party alignments and possible permutations of cabinet posts, Ramsay MacDonald had died."

Neville Chamberlain

Chamberlain has been portrayed in the following films and television productions:
E. G. Miller in Citizen Kane (1941)
Robin Bailey in The Gathering Storm (1974)
Edward Jewesbury in Churchill and the Generals (1979)
Eric Porter in Winston Churchill: The Wilderness Years (1981)  
Michael Aldridge in Countdown to War (1989)  
Richard Clarke in The Kennedys of Massachusetts (1990) 
Patrick Cargill in Heil Honey I'm Home! (1990)
Roger Brierley in Mosley (1998)
Christopher Good in Dunkirk (2004)
Oliver Muirhead in An American Carol (2008)
Jack Shepherd in Into the Storm (2009)
Roger Parrott in The King's Speech (2010) 
Rupert Frazer in Downton Abbey (2015)
Ronald Pickup in Darkest Hour (2017)

Winston Churchill

Clement Attlee

Literature

Clement Attlee  composed this limerick about himself to demonstrate how he was often underestimated:

An alternative version also exists, which may reflect Attlee's use of English more closely:

Drama

 Played by Patrick Troughton in Edward & Mrs. Simpson.
 Played by Patrick Stewart in the 1974 BBC-TV production The Gathering Storm.
 A character in the play Tom and Clem, by Stephen Churchett. In the original production in 1997, Alec McCowen played Attlee, and Michael Gambon played Tom Driberg.
 Played by Alan David in the final episode of the BBC sitcom Goodnight Sweetheart.
 The main character in the BBC Radio 4 Saturday Play episode That Man Attlee. Broadcast on 15 September 2007, it was written by Robin Glendinning, with Bill Wallis playing Attlee.
 Played by his grandson Richard Attlee, in the TV series Dunkirk in 2004, and in Jerome Vincent's "Stuffing Their Mouths with Gold", the story of how the National Health Service came to be. Broadcast on Radio 4 on 4 July 2008, the day before the 60th anniversary of the founding of the NHS.
 Played by Bill Paterson in Into the Storm (2009).
 Played by Michael Sheldon in Three Days in May by Ben Brown on a national tour and at Trafalgar Studios (2011–12).
 Played by Simon Chandler in the Netflix series The Crown (2016).

Film
 Attlee is portrayed by David Schofield in Darkest Hour (2017).

Anthony Eden

Literature

Eden appears as a character in James P. Hogan's science-fiction novel The Proteus Operation.
In Harry Turtledove's novel, The Big Switch, Eden appears as a member of a group of disgruntled MPs who are gathered together by Ronald Cartland after Britain allies with Germany in mid-1940.
In Harry Turtledove's Worldwar series of alternate history science-fiction novels, Eden first appears as the representative of the United Kingdom at the peace talks with the alien Race in Cairo. As it does not have nuclear weapons at that point in the story, the United Kingdom is not fully recognised by the Race, but is also too powerful for them to fully discount. Eden attempts to secure full recognition of the United Kingdom by the Race, but fails. Atvar, the Race's commander, notes that Eden is highly competent but attempting to negotiate from a position of weakness. In the succeeding series, Colonization, Eden is Prime Minister in 1962, leading a government which cultivates close relations with the German Reich. When Germany and the Race go to war, Eden refuses to lend British military assistance to the Reich, though formally supports German efforts against the Race.

Music

Eden is mentioned in a song by The Kinks, "She's Bought a Hat Like Princess Marina", from the album Arthur (1969).

Plays

Eden appears as a character in the play Never So Good (2008)—portrayed as a hysterical, pill-addicted wreck, spying on members of his own Cabinet by ordering government chauffeurs to report on their comings and goings. He is shown being overwhelmed by the chaos of the Suez Crisis and eventually forced out of office by his Conservative Party colleagues, at the urging of the American government.
Eden appears in Peter Morgan's stage play The Audience (2013); in the premiere, he was played by Michael Elwyn). In the 2015 West End revival version, featuring Kristin Scott Thomas as the Queen, Eden is portrayed by Scottish actor David Robb. His scene in the play is a prediction of Eden's audience with the Queen the day before the invasion of Anglo-French forces in Egypt. The conversation that takes place features Eden attempting to feed selected information to the Queen rather than the whole facts about the Suez crisis and the Queen's reaction to the proposed invasion. In the play's 2015 rewrite,  the Queen makes reference to Tony Blair, seen in a flashback, and his proposal to send troops to Iraq, likening it to the conversation she'd had with Eden 50 years previously about Suez.

Television

As Secretary of State for War in 1940, Eden authorised the setting-up of the Local Defence Volunteers (soon renamed the Home Guard). In the film of the TV sitcom Dad's Army, the (fictional) Walmington-on-Sea platoon is formed in response to Eden's radio broadcast. Platoon second-in-command Sergeant Wilson is flattered when his resemblance to Eden is remarked upon.
Eden is portrayed by Jeremy Northam in the Netflix television series The Crown.
Eden is portrayed by Anthony Calf in the BBC television series Upstairs Downstairs (2010 edition).
The first season of the UK TV series The Hour revolves around the Suez Crisis and the effect of journalism and censorship on the public's perception of Eden and his government, as a metaphor for modern Western military involvement in the Middle East.
In the Ian Curteis television play Suez 1956 (1979), Michael Gough portrayed Eden.
In the 1978 television series Edward & Mrs Simpson he was portrayed by Hugh Fraser

Film

Eden is portrayed by Samuel West in Darkest Hour (2017).

Harold Macmillan
Beyond the Fringe (1960–1966)
During his premiership in the early 1960s Macmillan was savagely satirised for his alleged decrepitude by the comedian Peter Cook in the stage revue Beyond the Fringe. 'Even when insulted to his face attending the show,' a biographer notes, 'Macmillan felt it was better to be mocked than ignored.' One of the sketches was revived by Cook for television.
Suez 1956 (1979)
Richard Vernon stars as Macmillan, with Michael Gough as Eden, in a three-hour-and-ten-minute BBC television play by Ian Curteis.
Winston Churchill: The Wilderness Years (1981)
Macmillan appears as a supporting character, played by Ian Collier, in the 1981 miniseries Winston Churchill: The Wilderness Years produced by Southern Television for ITV.
A Letter of Resignation (1997–98)
Set in 1963 during the Profumo scandal, Hugh Whitemore's play A Letter of Resignation, first staged at the Comedy Theatre in October 1997, dramatises the occasion when Macmillan, staying with friends in Scotland, received a political bombshell, the letter of resignation from Profumo, his war minister.
Edward Fox portrayed Macmillan with uncanny accuracy, but the play also explores the involvement of MI5 and the troubled relationship between Macmillan and his wife (Clare Higgins) who had made no secret of her adultery with the wayward Tory MP, Robert Boothby. The play was directed by Christopher Morahan.
Eden's Empire (2006)
Macmillan was played by Kevin Quarmby in Gemma Fairlie's production of James Graham's play Eden's Empire at the Finborough Theatre, London, in 2006.
Never So Good (2008)
Never So Good is a four-act play by Howard Brenton, a portrait of Macmillan against a backdrop of fading Empire, two world wars, the Suez crisis, adultery and Tory politics at the Ritz.
Brenton paints the portrait of a brilliant, witty but complex man, tragically out of kilter with his times, an Old Etonian who eventually loses his way in a world of shifting values.
The play premiered at the National Theatre in March 2008, directed by Howard Davies with Jeremy Irons as Macmillan.
The Crown (2016)
Macmillan is portrayed by Anton Lesser in the Netflix series The Crown.
Pennyworth (2019)
Macmillan is portrayed by Richard Clothier in the Epix series Pennyworth.

Alec Douglas-Home
The Night They Tried to Kidnap the Prime Minister (2009), played by Tim McInnerny – a BBC Radio 4 drama based on a real-life kidnapping attempt in 1964.
 The Crown (2016), played by David Annen.

Harold Wilson

Television

 The Lavender List (2006), played by Kenneth Cranham – a BBC Four fictionalised account by Francis Wheen of the Wilson Government of 1974–1976, with Gina McKee as Marcia Williams and Celia Imrie as Wilson's wife. The play concentrated on Wilson and Williams' relationship and her conflict with the Downing Street Press Secretary Joe Haines.
 The Plot Against Harold Wilson (2006), played by James Bolam – aired on BBC Two on 16 March 2006. The drama detailed previously unseen evidence that rogue elements of MI5 and the British military plotted to take down the Labour Government, believing Wilson to be a Soviet spy.
 Longford (2006), played by Robert Pugh – Channel 4 drama on the life of Lord Longford. In one scene, Wilson was seen dismissing Longford from his cabinet in 1968, in part because of the adverse publicity the latter was receiving for his public campaign supporting  Myra Hindley, then incarcerated for her involvement in the Moors Murders.
 In series 3 of The Crown, Harold Wilson is portrayed by Jason Watkins.
 In Stonehouse, a dramatisation of the career of John Stonehouse, Wilson is portrayed by Kevin McNally.

Film
 The Boat That Rocked (2009), played by Stephen Moore (character not actually addressed or credited by name, only as 'Prime Minister')
 Made in Dagenham (2010), played by John Sessions

Other
 A Viking in the Asterix story Asterix and the Great Crossing (1975) is named Haraldwilssen in the English translation, because the translators felt his physical features resembled Wilson. 
 The Audience (stage play, 2013, played in the premiere production by Richard McCabe)
 In The Alteration by Kingsley Amis, set in an parallel universe dominated by the Papacy, Pope John XXIV is depicted as a Machiavellian Yorkshireman (a thinly-veiled portrayal of Wilson) who controls the population of Europe through Malthusian means including the use of bacteriological warfare and war with the Ottoman Empire.
 He is briefly referenced in the Beatles song "Taxman", together with his political opponent Edward Heath.

Edward Heath
 Sunday (2002), played by Corin Redgrave
 The Long Walk to Finchley (2008), played by Samuel West
 Margaret (2009), played by Nigel Le Vaillant
 The Iron Lady (2011), played by John Sessions
 The Crown (2016), played by Michael Maloney

James Callaghan
 The Audience (stage play, 2013, played in the premiere production by David Peart)

Margaret Thatcher

John Major

Tony Blair

Gordon Brown

David Cameron

Theresa May

 Gillian Bevan played Theresa May in the second series of the Channel 4 comedy The Windsors.
 Jacqueline King played Theresa May in the 2017 docudrama Theresa v Boris: How May Became PM which chronicled the 2016 Conservative leadership election.

Boris Johnson

References

 
Lists of prime ministers of the United Kingdom